Insanity is a thrill ride located 900 ft (270m) above ground at the top of The Strat in Las Vegas, Nevada that opened in 2005. As of March 2023, Insanity is closed until further notice, and has been removed from the list of thrill rides at the resort.

References

External links